Shenouda (  ) is an Egyptian male name, which is commonly used among Egyptian Christians (the Copts).

The difference in pronunciation and transcription of the last part of the name is because of differing pronunciations in the main Coptic dialects for the Coptic alphabet.

Some of the most famous people with this name include:
 Saint Shenouda the Archimandrite

Popes of Alexandria 

 Pope Shenouda I of Alexandria (r. 859–880)
 Pope Shenouda II of Alexandria (r. 1032–1046)
 Pope Shenouda III of Alexandria (r. 1971–2012)

Coptic given names